The University of Luhansk (officially Taras Shevchenko National University of Luhansk, often referred to as LNU), is the oldest university in Donbas region and has a reputation as one of Ukraine's most prestigious universities.

Following the 2014 pro-Russian unrest in Ukraine and the establishment of Luhansk People's Republic (LPR), this university was partitioned into two university. One continues to operate in the same campus as before in Luhansk and later renamed into Lugansk State Pedagogical University (Луганский государственный педагогический университет, LGPU) in 2020. Ukraine-controlled university was forcibly relocated to Ukraine-controlled Starobilsk and later relocated to Poltava due to 2022 Russian invasion of Ukraine

U of Luhansk grew out of an association of professors in the city of Luhansk that was formed by the Soviet authorities as Teachers' Training Institute in 1921.

In addition to cultural and practical participation in the work of the Ukrainian society, the university participates in international projects, such as an MBA joint program with Franklin Pierce University.

History

March 1, 1921 (The University Day) – Regional Teachers' Training Courses were opened.
1923 – The first higher educational establishment was founded in Donbas region: Donets Institute of National Education (DIPE) in Luhansk.
1934 – Donetsk Institute of National Education was reorganized into Luhansk State Pedagogical Institute.
1939 – Luhansk State Pedagogical Institute was named after Taras Shevchenko.
1993 –  Hrinchenko Studies Institute and Canada-Ukraine Renaissance Centre were opened at the University of Luhansk.
1998 – Institute obtained the IV level of accreditation; Luhansk Taras Shevchenko State Pedagogical University was founded on the base of the institute.
2000 – LNPU was recognised as the best university in Ukraine for sports achievements (2 silver and 1 bronze medals of the XXVII Olympic Games in Sidney), according to the results of the VII Open International Assessment "Zolota Fortuna" the university won two prizes: "Best Ukrainian Regional University" and "Great Contribution to Ukrainian Pedagogical Science Development."
2001 – the Eastern Branch of Taras Shevchenko Institute of Literature of the National Academy of Sciences of Ukraine (the joint order No. 363 of the Ministry of Education and Science of Ukraine and the National Academy of Sciences of Ukraine) was founded at the University of Luhansk; the scientific research centre "Regional Higher Education" (a joint project with the Institute of Higher Education of the Academy of Pedagogical Sciences of Ukraine) was founded; LNPU became a member and regional representative of the International Academy of Pedagogical Education in Moscow.
2002 – According to the results of the IX International Academic Assessment "Zolota Fortuna" the U of Luhansk received the Silver Stella and the Diploma "The 3-rd Millennium Best Quality of Education".
2003 – According to the President's Decree No. 1012/2003 on 11 September Luhansk Taras Shevchenko State Pedagogical University acquired the status of National University.
2004 – According to the results of the XI International Academic Assessment "Gold Fortune (Zolota Fortuna)" university was rewarded with the IV Degree Order "For Work Achievements."
2004 – Four branches of the Institute of the National Academy of Sciences of Ukraine were opened at the university: the Institute of Applied Mathematics and Mechanics, Donetsk O. Galkin Physical and Engineering Institute, the Institute of Industrial Economy and the Institute of Archaeology.
2005 – Luhansk Taras Shevchenko National Pedagogical University was awarded the silver medal in the nomination "Modernisation of Higher Education According to the Principles of the Bologna Declaration" at the VIII International Exhibition of Higher Education Institutions.
2005 – LNPU received honorary university title of "Leader of Modern Education" and got the diploma "For High Achievements in Pedagogical and Scientific Activities and Important Contribution to the Modernisation of the National System of Education."
2006 – Luhansk Taras Shevchenko National Pedagogical University was awarded the Gold Medal of the IX International Exhibition of Educational Establishments in the nomination "Introduction of New Forms of the Organization of Teaching Process."
2006 – LNPU acquired Honorary University Title of "Leader of Modern Education" and "Leader in Creation of Up-to-date Training Aids."
2006 – According to the Assessment of Higher Education Institutions of Ukraine of the Ministry of Education and Science of Ukraine, is the best higher education institution in Ukraine.
2006–2007 – German Language and Culture Center of Goethe-Institute was established at the university. The Confucius Institute was opened that academic year.
2007 – Luhansk Taras Shevchenko National Pedagogical University was awarded with golden medal of the 10th Anniversary Exhibition "Modern Education in Ukraine – 2007" for "Introducing the Achievements of Pedagogy into the Practice of Education." Apart from this the university acquired the title "Leader of Modern Education."
2007 – According to the results of the Assessment of the Universities of Ukraine Luhansk Taras Shevchenko National Pedagogical University was named the best Ukrainian higher educational establishment by the Ministry of Science of Ukraine.
2008 – University of Luhansk officially became Luhansk Taras Shevchenko National University.
2014 – Due to the War in Donbass the university was evacuated to Starobilsk. 20% of the staff remained in Luhansk running their own version of the university controlled by Luhansk People's Republic. 80% of staff and about half its pre-conflict 20,000 student (including 800 international students) were regained by the university. In the 2014 Ukrainian parliamentary election the university president Vitaliy Kurylo was elected as member of the Ukrainian parliament.
2020 – Lugansk University in Luhansk People's Republic was renamed into Lugansk State Pedagogical University(Луганский государственный педагогический университет, LGPU).
2022 – Due to the 2022 Russian invasion of Ukraine the university in Starobilsk was evacuated to Poltava.

Organization

Institutes

Institute of Economics and Business
Institute of Physics, Mathematics and Information Technologies
Institute of History, International Relations and Socio-Political Sciences
Institute of Pedagogy and Psychology
Institute of Commerce, Serving Technology and Tourism
Institute of Culture and Arts
Institute of Continuing Education and Distance Study
Institute of Physical Education and Sports

Campuses and buildings
3 academics buildings
7 dormitories
sport center
workshops
household services centre;
3 libraries
Dining room
2 stores
Sanatorium
Park museum of the ancient art of stone-cutting
The Church

Faculties

Faculty of Foreign Languages
Faculty of Natural Sciences
Faculty of Ukrainian Philology and Social Communications

Colleges
Stakhanov Pedagogical College
Lysychansk Pedagogical College

Schools and lyceums
Luhansk Vocational Culinary Lyceum
Bryanka Technologic Economic Lyceum
Rubizhne O. E. Poray-Koshytsya Polytechnic School

Departments
Department of Statistics, Quality Monitoring and Curriculum Development
Personnel department
Documents turnover organizing department
Scientific Research Department
Economic department
Administrative-economic section
Centre of Innovative Technologies
Editorial-publication department
Accreditation and licensing department
International Department

Achievements

Honors and prizes
2007 - Gold Medal at the Tenth Anniversary Exhibition "Modern Education in Ukraine 2007" for "Introduction of New Kinds of Pedagogical Science in Educational Process"; Honorary University Title of "Leader of Modern Education".
2007 - LNPU is the best university in Ukraine according to the Assessment of the Ministry of Science of Ukraine.
2006 - LNPU was the best university in Ukraine according to the Assessment of the Ministry of Science of Ukraine.
2006 - Honorary University Title of "Leader of Modern Education" and "Introduction of New Forms of Educational Process"; Gold Medal in the nomination "Introduction of New Forms of Education" – " Modern Education in Ukraine ".
2005 - Silver Medal in the nomination "Modernization of Higher Education According to the Principles of the Bologna Declaration"; The Diploma for High Achievements in Pedagogical and Scientific Activities and Important Contribution to the Modernization of the National System of Education; Honorary University Title of "Leader of Modern Education".
2004 - Order "For Academic Achievements" according to the Eleventh International Academic Assessment «Gold Fortune (Zolota Fortuna)». 
2004 - First Degree Diploma and Special Diploma of the Kiev International Exhibition - Fair "Knizhkovy Sad - 2004".
2004 - Bronze Medal of the Fourth International Exhibition - Fair "Knizhkoviy Svit - 2004".
2004 - Diploma of the Special International Exhibition - Fair "Education. Science. Festival of Slavonic Books and Press".
2004 - Diploma of the First degree and Silver Nestor the Chroniclewriter of the Fifth Kiev International Exhibition-Fair "Knizhkovy Svit - 2003".
2003 - Special Diploma of the Third Kiev International Exhibition - Fair "Knizhkovy Sad - 2003".
2003 - Bronze Medal of the Fourth International Exhibition Contest "Modern Education in Ukraine".
2003 - Diploma of the Regional Exhibition "Book. Polygraphs. Publicity. Information."
2002 - Diploma "The Quality of Education of the Third Millennium" according to the results of the Eleventh International Academic Assessment «Zolota Fortuna» . 
2000 - "The best Regional Educational Establishment" according to the Sixth International Academic Assessment "Zolota Fortuna" - 2000.

Olympic champions among LNU alumni and faculty
Mykola Chujikov - boat-race, XVII Games, Tokyo, 1964
Volodymyr Belyaev – volleyball, XIX Games, Mexico, 1968
Anatoliy Chukanov – cycle racing, XXII Games, Montreal, 1976
Valeriy Kryvov – volleyball, XXII Games, Moscow, 1980
Fedor Laschonov – volleyball, XXII Games, Moscow, 1980
Viktor Bryzgin – athletics, XXIV Games, Seoul, 1988
Olga Bryzgina – athletics, XXIV Games, Seoul, 1988; XXV games, Barcelona, 1992
Grigoriy Misutin – artistic gymnastics, XXV Games, Barcelona, 1992
Igor Korobchynskiy - artistic gymnastics, XXV Games, Barcelona, 1992
Oleg Kucherenko - Greco-Roman wrestling, XXV Games, Barcelona, 1992

Olympic Games prize-winners
Anatoliy Kuksov
 – football, XX Games, Munich, 1972
Yuriy Eleseev - football, XX Games, Munich, 1972
Tetyana Skachko – athletics, XXII, Games, Moscow
Ruslan Mezentsev - artistic gymnastics, Sydney, 2002
David Saldadze - Graeco-Roman wrestling, Sydney, 2002
Iryna Yanovich - cycle racing track, Sydney, 2002
Andriy Serdinov – swimming, Athens, 2004
Tetyana Tereschuk-Antipova – hurdling, Athens, 2004

Olympic Games' participants
Viktor Savchenko – athletics, XXII Games, Montreal, 1976
Volodymyr Skomorohov - athletics, XXII Games, Montreal, 1976
Anatoliy Yarosh - athletics, XXII Games, Moscow, 1980
Oleksandr Doroshenko – XXII Paralympic Games, Athens, 2004

Honorable doctors and famous alumni
Sergey Ivanovich Aksenenko - Soviet Ukrainian writer, journalist
Udovenko Alexander - composer, studio " Kvartal -95"
Alexander Doroshenko - two-time champion of Paralympic Games
Oleg Fisunenko - geologist and paleontologist
Vasyl Holoborodko - poet
Dmitry Kozlov - lead writer, studio "Kvartal-95."
Kamen’ Nikita - Luhansk football player known as "Zorya"
Anatoly Shirshov - Mathematician and scientist
Kurylo Vitaliy  - president of university,  the academician of the National Academy of Pedagogical Sciences of Ukraine
Trifonov Vitaly  - had of Security Service of Ukraine.
Alexander Vorobiev - Honored Master of Sports, Olympic bronze medalist, member of the Ukrainian national gymnastics team
Andrey Yakovlev - head of the production TV films, channel "Inter"
Yaroslav Minkin - poet, cultural activist, peacebuilder, human rights defender

References

External links
 Taras Shevchenko National University of Luhansk homepage
  U of Luhansk Students' Site
  LNPU Library
 Ecology and Tourism volunteers club "Corsac"
 Students' Union
 LNPU Publishing House "Alma-mater"
 Laboratory of Distance Education

Taras Shevchenko
Educational institutions established in 1921
University of Luhansk
1921 establishments in Ukraine